This article presents lists of the literary events and publications in the 10th century.



Works

Authors

See also
 10th century in poetry
 11th century in literature
 Early Medieval literature
 Golden age of Jewish culture in Spain
 List of years in literature

Notes

References

  * 
 
 
 
 
 

 
 
History of literature